Grandon is a grade II listed building on Hadley Green Road, in Monken Hadley, north of Chipping Barnet. The house faces Hadley Green and was once the home of the writers Fanny Trollope and her son Anthony Trollope.

References

External links

Grade II listed buildings in the London Borough of Barnet
Anthony Trollope
Houses in the London Borough of Barnet
Monken Hadley